Ellis Nutall (8 December 1890 – 1 July 1951) was a British barrister and politician who was Conservative MP for Birkenhead West from 1924 to 1929.

Educated at Rugby School and Trinity College, Oxford, Nuttall was called to the bar by the Middle Temple in 1913. He served in the Royal Field Artillery during the First World War in Egypt, Gallipoli, and France. After the war, he returned to his practice on the Northern Circuit.

He won Birkenhead West in 1924, but lost it to Labour in 1929. He returned to service in the British Army during the Second World War.

References 

Conservative Party (UK) MPs for English constituencies
1890 births
1951 deaths
British Army personnel of World War I
British Army personnel of World War II
Royal Field Artillery officers
People educated at Rugby School
Alumni of Trinity College, Oxford
Members of the Middle Temple